The final of the Men's 4×100m Freestyle Relay event at the European LC Championships 1995 was held on 25 August 1995 in Vienna, Austria.

Results

See also
1996 Men's Olympic Games 4x100m Freestyle Relay
1995 Men's World Championships (SC) 4x100m Freestyle

References
 scmsom results

R